Senator Seymour may refer to:

Members of the United States Senate
Horatio Seymour (Vermont politician) (1778–1857), U.S. Senator from Vermont from 1821 to 1833
John Seymour (California politician) (born 1937), U.S. Senator from California from 1991 to 1992

United States state senate members
Edward Woodruff Seymour (1832–1892), Connecticut State Senate
Edward Seymour (Vermont politician) (1810–1883), Vermont State Senate
Henry W. Seymour (1834–1906), Michigan State Senate
Henry Seymour (Commissioner) (1780–1837), New York State Senate
James Seymour (Iowa politician) (born 1939), Iowa State Senate
James Seymour (Michigan politician) (1791–1864), Michigan State Senate
Morris Woodruff Seymour (1843–1920), Connecticut State Senate
Whitney North Seymour Jr. (1923–2019), New York State Senate